The Goddess Ugratara is the tutelary deity of Eastern Ganga dynasty kings of erstwhile Kalinga dynasty. Her ancient temple lies at Mulajharigarh village, Bhusandapur 65 kilometers from State capital Bhubaneswar, Odisha, India.  The icon of Mother Tara is three-eyed and Chaturbhuja, holding potent weapons as sword, dagger, blue lotus and a drinking cup in her hands. She stands over a corpse on burning flames of funeral pyre. Serpent anklets and a serpent on crown are visible which clearly dates back to the time of the 11th-century Tantrik text Sadhanamala Tantra. When later kings of Gajapati dynasty revered goddess Kali or Shyamakaali she had less importance and her worship received less attention. But many people belonging to Vasishtha Gotra revere her as Ishta devi. She is one among ten Mahavidya in Hindu Tantrik theology. She is very popular as Ugratara due to her fierce aspect, but benevolent to the adorers as Ekajata/Neela-Saraswati. Nearby railway station is Bhushandapur in Khordha district which is accessible from Bhubaneswar  and Balugaon by local passenger trains. The main festivals here are Chaitra parba, Raja Parba, Sharadiya Durga Puja. She is worshipped in tantrik way and offered all tantrik fivefold paraphrenalias.

References
the ugratara cult of Utkal
Shakti sadhana in Utkal
the equating relation between the buddhist and Tantric goddess Tara
seek here the blessings of maa Ugra Tara
 Tara Worship in Bhusandapur
Home page of Temple

Notes

the equating relation between the buddhist and Tantric goddess Tara
seek here the blessings of maa Ugra Tara
 Tara Worship in Bhusandapur

External links
map showing the location

Hindu temples in Khordha district
Shakti temples
Eastern Ganga dynasty